Samuel Richardson  was an 18th-century English novelist and printer. 

Sam or Samuel Richardson may also refer to:

Samuel T. Richardson (1857–1921), American attorney and educator
Sam Richardson (actor) (born 1984), American film actor
Samuel Richardson (cricketer) (1844–1938), English cricketer
Samuel Richardson (Baptist), English layman and religious controversialist of the 1640s and 1650s
Sam Richardson (athlete) (1917–1989), Canadian athlete
Garnet Richardson (1933–2016), Canadian curler known as Sam
Samuel Richardson (High Sheriff) (1738–?), justice of the peace and High Sheriff of Gloucestershire in 1787 and Glamorganshire in 1798